Shell House is an area of coastal cliffs located between Red Bluff and Bluff Point in Kalbarri National Park in Mid West Western Australia. They are highly regarded for their scenery, and also for the exposures of geological strata, which include Ordovician Tumblagooda sandstone, Triassic Wittecarra sandstone and Kockatea shale. The Shell House cliffs have been listed on Australia's Register of the National Estate since 1978.

References

Geology of Western Australia
Heritage places of Western Australia
Western Australian places listed on the defunct Register of the National Estate
Mid West (Western Australia)
Cliffs of Australia